Trinity Memorial Church is a historic Episcopal church located at Binghamton in Broome County, New York.  It was completed in 1897 and is a High Victorian Gothic style structure constructed of bluestone with limestone watertable and trim.  The front facade features a large square projecting tower with a side entrance and a smaller, secondary apse. Also on the front facade is a large Gothic arched window with geometrict tracery and stained glass.

The original architects were Lacey & Bartoo. In 1949 the parish house was completed to designs by George Bain Cummings, their successor.

It was listed on the National Register of Historic Places in 1998.

References

External links
Trinity Memorial Episcopal Church. Binghamton, NY website

Churches in Broome County, New York
National Register of Historic Places in Broome County, New York
Churches on the National Register of Historic Places in New York (state)
Episcopal church buildings in New York (state)
Churches completed in 1897
19th-century Episcopal church buildings
Buildings and structures in Binghamton, New York